Martin Švejnoha (born 25 November 1977) is a former Czech football player.

References

External links
 
 
 

1977 births
Living people
Czech footballers
Association football defenders
Czech Republic youth international footballers
Czech Republic under-21 international footballers
Sportspeople from Příbram
FC Zbrojovka Brno players
1. FC Slovácko players
FC Viktoria Plzeň players
FC Wacker Innsbruck (2002) players
Austrian Football Bundesliga players
Czech expatriate footballers
Expatriate footballers in Austria
Czech expatriate sportspeople in Austria
WSG Tirol players